Roberto Suárez (born 17 February 1924) was an Argentine rower. He competed in the men's coxed four event at the 1952 Summer Olympics.

References

External links
 

1924 births
Possibly living people
Argentine male rowers
Olympic rowers of Argentina
Rowers at the 1952 Summer Olympics
Place of birth missing